Czesław Zakaszewski (19 July 1886 in Warsaw – 2 February 1959 in Warsaw) was a Polish hydrotechnician and meliorator. Professor of the Warsaw University of Technology, member of the Warsaw Scientific Society.

He was an author of numerous technical projects, thesis and textbooks.

Notable works
 Books
 

 Articles
 "Zasoby wodne i gospodarowanie nimi jako przesłanki w planowaniu przestrzennym i lokalizacji"
 "Perspektywy rozwiązań obecnych trudności gospodarki wodnej"
 "Dolina Neru jako urządzenie gospodarcze"

 Reports and co-reports
 "Wpływ kanału żeglugi Żerań-Zegrze na stosunki wodne tarasu praskiego"

References

 

1886 births
1959 deaths
Hydrologists
Academic staff of the Warsaw University of Technology
Burials at Powązki Cemetery